Tess of the Storm Country is a 1932 American pre-Code drama film directed by directed by Alfred Santell and starring Janet Gaynor, Charles Farrell, and Dudley Digges. It was released by Fox Film Corporation.  It is based on the novel of the same name by Grace Miller White and its adaptation for the stage by Rupert Hughes.

Gaynor and Farrell made almost a dozen films together, including Frank Borzage's classics Seventh Heaven (1927), Street Angel (1928), and Lucky Star (1929). Gaynor won the first Academy Award for Best Actress for the first two films and F. W. Murnau's Sunrise: A Song of Two Humans.

The film's copyright was renewed in 1960.

Cast

Janet Gaynor as Tess Howland
Charles Farrell as Frederick Garfield, Jr.
Dudley Digges as Captain Howland
Dan Green as Katsura
June Clyde as Teola Garfield
Claude Gillingwater as Frederick Garfield Sr.
George Meeker as Dan Taylor
Sarah Padden as Old Martha
Edward Pawley as Ben Letts

See also 
 List of American films of 1932
 1932 in film

References

External links 

1932 films
1932 drama films
American drama films
American black-and-white films
1930s English-language films
Films directed by Alfred Santell
Fox Film films
Films based on American novels
Films based on works by Grace Miller White
Films based on works by Rupert Hughes
Films with screenplays by Sonya Levien
1930s American films